Anaphlocteis is a genus of beetles in the family Buprestidae, containing the following species:

 Anaphlocteis camerunicus Bellamy, 1986
 Anaphlocteis denticollis (Fahreus, 1851)
 Anaphlocteis dormitzeri (Obenberger, 1922)
 Anaphlocteis elongatus (Kerremans, 1900)
 Anaphlocteis orientalis Bellamy, 1986
 Anaphlocteis pulchrus (Obenberger, 1922)
 Anaphlocteis satanas (Obenberger, 1917)
 Anaphlocteis strandi (Obenberger, 1922)
 Anaphlocteis zanzibaricus (Kerremans, 1903)

References

Buprestidae genera